Ponta do Lobo is a headland in the southeastern part of the island of Santiago, Cape Verde. It is in the municipality of São Domingos, 4 km east of Vale da Custa, 4 km southeast of Moia Moia and 11 km northeast of Praia. The nearby bay Porto Lobo was mentioned as P. Lobo on the 1747 map by Jacques-Nicolas Bellin. The Ponta do Lobo Lighthouse stands on the headland.

References

Headlands of Cape Verde
Geography of Santiago, Cape Verde
São Domingos Municipality, Cape Verde